Highcliffe Manor is an American sitcom with a gothic horror background focused on the events in a mansion with crazy scientists and strange figures. The series starred Shelley Fabares and aired on NBC from April 12 to May 3, 1979.

Summary
The plot concerned the goings on at Highcliffe Manor, a creepy old mansion on a desolate island in New England. Helen Blacke, an attractive but flaky widow, is the owner of the mansion that was home to the Blacke Foundation, a scientific research institute with a houseful of sinister characters which included Frances, a mad scientist; Bram Shelley, a bionic man; Ian Glenville, a womanizing preacher; Cheng, a huge Korean assistant; Wendy Sparkles, a sexy secretary; Rebecca, a creepy housekeeper and evil doctors Lester and Sanchez. Each episode featured voice-over narration by Peter Lawford.

Cast
Shelley Fabares as Helen Blacke  (widow of the foundation's founder)
Stephen McHattie as Reverend Ian Glenville
Eugenie Ross-Leming as Dr. Frances Kisgadden 
Gerald Gordon as Dr. Felix Morger (former assistant to the late Berkeley Blacke)
Audrey Landers as Wendy Sparkles (secretary to the late Mr. Blacke)
Jenny O'Hara as Rebecca (the housekeeper)
Christian Marlowe as Bram Shelley (the bionic man)
David Byrd as Dr. Lester
Luis Avalos as Dr. Sanchez
Ernie Hudson as Smythe (valet to the late Mr. Blacke)
Harold Sakata as Cheng

Episodes

References
Brooks, Tim; Marsh, Earle. The Complete Directory to Prime Time Network and Cable TV Shows 1946–Present. Eight Edition. New York: Ballantine, 2003.

External links 
 

1979 American television series debuts
1979 American television series endings
1970s American sitcoms
NBC original programming
English-language television shows
Television series by Alan Landsburg Productions
Television shows set in Philadelphia